Dancing Dolls are a Japanese female idol group. The group originally consisted of five childhood friends from Osaka: Hono (Honoka Kadomoto - 門元穂果), Mii (Misaki Nakajima - 中島弥咲), Misaki (Misaki Sakurada - 桜田美咲), and twins Asuka (Asuka Nagayama - 永山飛鳥) and Kyoka (Kyouka Nagayama - 永山杏佳).

History 
The group was formed in Osaka by childhood friends. They started performing in the street in Osaka Castle Park, which is a local haven for street performances. The girls wrote and composed their own songs; Misaki choreographed the dances. Dancing Dolls also began uploading dance covers to video sharing websites Nico Nico Douga and YouTube and achieved some notability there. Their videos became popular, and totaled over 10 million views by the time of their professional debut in 2012.

Dancing Dolls were signed by Sony Music Entertainment Japan and on September 12, 2012, released their debut single, titled "Touch -A.S.A.P.- / Shanghai Darling".  At the time, the group's average age was 16. The single reached the 38th place in the Oricon Weekly Singles Chart. Also, the CD single was preceded by "Shanghai Darling", which was released on August 1 for digital download and peaked at the 8th spot in the daily Recochoku chart. The song "Touch -A.S.A.P-" is a cover of a theme song from the anime Touch, originally sung by Yoshimi Iwasaki and released as a single in 1985. They too made a cover of ECHO, a single by Circrush who is sung by Megpoid English, what is the English version of Megpoid.

In May 2014, the twin sisters Kyoka and Asuka left the group and Dancing Dolls became inactive for several months.

At the end of January 2015, Miu and Kanon were recruited as new Dancing Dolls members. Both girls have started dance practice and song recording. The staff of the idol group published a picture of the new members and a video in which their faces are hidden in order to keep the identities of the new members a mystery until February 14. They were officially introduced and made their debut during Dancing Dolls’ live performance on February 14 in Tokyo. At the same time, they revealed that their new single My Way / Love Me, Love Me is planned to be released on March 25, 2015. This is the group's first album in 10 months with new members Miu and Kanon. The next Dancing Dolls’ single features a cover of the song Melo Melo Bakkyun sung by Miu and Kanon.

They haven't officially disbanded, but haven't been active since 2015 and members have focused on pursuing other activities.

Members

Discography

Singles

Videography

Music videos

References

External links 
 Dancing Dolls' official site
 Dancing Dolls' channel on YouTube (The channel is available in Japan only.)

Japanese pop music groups
Japanese girl groups
Japanese-language singers
Musical groups established in 2012
Sony Music Entertainment Japan artists
2012 establishments in Japan
Child musical groups
Musical groups from Osaka